Ciara Ní É is a bilingual Irish poet, writer and television presenter.

Biography
Ciara Ní É was born in Clontarf, Dublin. Though not raised speaking Irish, Ní É went to Coláiste Chamuis, Rossaveel in the Gaeltacht, the Irish speaking parts of Ireland, during her secondary school summers. She completed a degree in English Literature and Modern Irish at Trinity College Dublin in 2013. After graduating, Ní É spent a year in London with Dorling Kindersley. In 2015, she completed a master's degree in Scríobh agus Cumarsáid na Gaeilge at University College Dublin.  Ní É founded the REIC poetry night while taking her MA course. Ní É completed a year of teaching Irish as a Fulbright scholar teaching Irish at Villanova University, 2017 - 2018.

Ní É is a regular broadcaster both on the national TV channels of RTÉ and TG4. Since 2017, she also creates a regular YouTube series called 'What The Focal!?' where she talks about Irish. In 2020, she is the writer-in-residence for Dublin City University.

References

Living people
People from Clontarf, Dublin
21st-century Irish poets
Irish LGBT poets
Year of birth missing (living people)
21st-century LGBT people